First Priority Music (FPM) was an American hip hop record label of the late 1980s and early 1990s, which later released contemporary R&B and country music, among others. A small independent, it formed distribution relationships first with Atlantic Records, and later on with Jive/Zomba.

First Priority was founded by Nat Robinson in 1987, to release music by his son Kirk better known as Milk Dee of Audio Two. FPM's first release was Audio Two's "Make It Funky"/"Top Billin'", which was successful enough to secure the label a distribution deal with Atlantic Records.

MC Lyte's debut album Lyte as a Rock (1988) was followed by her records,  Eyes on This (1989) and Act Like You Know (1991). "Ruffneck", from 1993's Ain't No Other, was the first gold single by a solo female rap artist. Other members of the hip hop roster of the period include Positive K, Michie Mee, Alliance, Kings of Swing, and Barsha. A compilation featuring FPM artists, The First Priority Music Family: Basement Flavor, was released by the label in 1988. A short-lived sub-label called Bum Rush was distributed by Atlantic then-sister label Virgin Records from 1989 to 1991.

Recent years saw releases by Jason Downs and the 2004 single by Eamon called "Fuck It (I Don't Want You Back)," which were released through Jive/Zomba.

Artists

 Alliance
Audio Two
MC Lyte
Eamon (singer)
Positive K
Proven Innocent
Jason Downs
Michie Mee
Mekhi Phifer

References 
Peter Shapiro, Rough Guide to Hip-Hop, 2nd ed., Rough Guides; London, 2005 (p. 18, pp. 253–254).
Simon Price, "Rock and Pop", The Independent Sunday, June 24, 2001.
https://www.abc-7.com/story/41138393/hip-hops-first-priority-music-hits-reset-button-announces-expansion

External links 
Official site

American independent record labels
Hip hop record labels
Atlantic Records